Streptosiphon is a genus of flowering plants belonging to the family Acanthaceae.

Its native range is Tanzania.

Species
Species:
 Streptosiphon hirsutus Mildbr.

References

Acanthaceae
Acanthaceae genera
Taxa named by Johannes Mildbraed